Grupo Aeroméxico S.A.B. de C.V. is a airline holding company headquartered in Mexico City, GAM owns and operates Aeromexico, the principal airline of Mexico.

Shareholders 

Group of investors on undisclosed percentage 51% *
Delta Air Lines − 49%

Major subsidiaries 

The following is the corporate structure and list of current subsidiaries of grupo Aeromexico.

Administradora Central de negocios (Owns 99.99%)
Integración y Supervisión de Recursos Corporativos
Aeroeventos Mexicanos (Owns 05%)
Aerovías de México (Owns 99.998%)
Administradora Especializada en Negocios
Aerolitoral SA de CV (Aeromexico Connect)(Owns 99.74%)
Aerovias de Mexico Contigo SA de CV (Aeromexico Contigo)(Owns 22.89%)
Aeroméxico Cargo (Owns 50%)
Aerosys (Owns 50.01%, other 50% owned by Mexicana de Aviación)
Aerovías Empresa de Cargo
CECAAM (Owns 99.99%)
Estrategias Especializadas de Negocios
Fundación Aeroméxico A.C. (Owns 99.74%)
Inmobiliaria Blvd Apto – Inmobiliaria Fza Aérea – Inmobiliaria P de la Reforma (Owns 99.74%)
Operadora de Franquicias
SISTEM (Owns 99.74%)
Special Purpose Companies (Owns 99.74%)
SEAT - SICOPSA (Owns 50.01%, other 50% owned by Mexicana de Aviación)
AM Cargo
AM DL MRO Joint Venture AM-DL TechOps Querétaro (Owns 50%, other 50% owned by Delta Air Lines)
Concesionaria de vuelos (Owns 99.99%)
Empresa de Mantenimiento Aéreo (Owns 99.99%)
Premier Loyalty & Marketing (Owns 51%, other 49.5% owned by Aimia)
Loyalty Servicios Profesional
Premiun Alliance Services
Rempresac Comercial - Recursos Anare - Corporación Nadmin (Owns 99.81%)
Serv. Corp. Aeromexico (Owns 99.99%)

First level functionaries 
Name    -     Charge

Andrés Conesa Labastida - Chief Executive Officer (CEO)
Ricardo Sánchez Baker - Chief Financial Officer & EVP (CFO) 
Nicolas Ferri - Chief Commercial Officer & EVP (CCO) 
Angélica Garza Sánchez - Chief Human Resources Officer & EVP (CHRO) 
Andrés Castañeda Ochoa - Chief Customer & Digital Officer & EVP 
James Sarvis - Chief Operations Officer & EVP (COO) 
Sergio Allard Barroso - Chief Legal & Institutional Relations Officer & EVP

References 

Airline holding companies
Aeroméxico
Holding companies of Mexico